Presolana (Italian: Pizzo della Presolana) is a mountain located in Lombardy, northern Italy, about 35 km north of Bergamo.

Geography 
Part of the Bergamasque Alps, it is included in the province of Bergamo, and divides the Val Seriana and Valle di Scalve.

The top of the mountain is called Presolana Occidentale (Western Presolana) and has a maximum altitude of 2,521 m above sea level.

SOIUSA classification 
According to the SOIUSA (International Standardized Mountain Subdivision of the Alps) the mountain can be classified in the following way:
 main part = Eastern Alps
 major sector = Southern Limestone Alps
 section = Bergamasque Alps and Prealps
 subsection = Bergamasque Prealps
 supergroup = Prealpi Bergamasche Orientali
 group = Gruppo della Presolana
 subgroup = Costiera Presolana-Visolo-Bares
 code = II/C-29.II-C.7.b

Geology 
Presolana is notable as it is one of the few mountain in Lombardy composed of a limestone rock similar to dolomite.

Gallery

References 

Mountains of the Alps
Province of Bergamo
Mountains of Lombardy
Two-thousanders of Italy